Paula del Río Segura (Barcelona, February 28, 2000) is a Spanish film and television actress who has appeared in films such as El desconocido (2015), La sombra de la ley (2018) and Cuerdas (2019). In addition, she has been one of the protagonists of El internado: Las Cumbres (2021-2022), a reboot series of El internado, on Amazon Prime Video, with the role of Paz.

Biography 
She is the cousin of the actress Andrea del Río. She was born in Barcelona in 2000 and had her first performance at only 10 years old in the short film Levedad. In the following years, she continued participating in some short films until, in 2015, she made the leap to cinema with the film El desconocido, directed by Dani de la Torre, alongside Luis Tosar and Elvira Mínguez, among others.

In 2018, she participated again in another feature film by Dani de la Torre, La sombra de la ley, playing Elisa. In 2019, she starred in the feature film Cuerdas by José Luis Montesinos, playing the role of Elena, a paralyzed girl who is locked in her father's house with a dog that contracts rabies.

On television, she has participated in Centro médico, Servir y proteger, Hospital Valle Norte and Bany Compartit, where she played one of the main characters. n 2021, she joined the main cast of the reboot series of El internado, El internado: Las Cumbres, where she plays Paz.

Filmography

Cinema

Television

Awards and nominations

References

External links 
 Paula del Río on IMDb

Spanish television actresses
Spanish film actresses
Living people
2000 births